is a Japanese television drama series. It ran for 12 episodes. The cast primarily consists of Hello! Project members.

The song "Hatsukoi Cider" from Buono!'s single "Hatsukoi Cider / Deep Mind" was used as the closing theme for the TV series; the opening song is "Pyoco Pyoco Ultra" by Morning Musume.

Synopsis
In the private school of Machida Special High School of Mathematics, a fight for the "No. 1 Mathematics Boss" breaks out between two high school girls, Nina (Reina Tanaka) and Sayuri (Sayumi Michishige). A male student by the name of Kazuki (Dori Sakurada), who has zero interest in mathematics gets transferred to the school due to a mistake in the handling procedure.

Cast

Class 2A
 Reina Tanaka as Nina Machida
 Sayumi Michishige as Sayuri Tachikawa
 Dori Sakurada as Kazuki Sato
 Maimi Yajima as Mami Shibuya
 Airi Suzuki as Yuri Uehara
Recurring
 Risa Niigaki as Nagisa Toriumi
 Riho Sayashi as Sana Nagata
 Maro Kannagi as Umi Yamashita
 Meimi Tamura as Riku Ogura
 Ayaka Wada as Sora Tengenji
 Suzunosuke as Mr. Muraki
 Akari Saho as Mina Hatsudai
Shibuya Keibitai
 Haruka Kudō as Noa Miyashita
 Masaki Sato as Rion Miyamasu
 Haruna Iikubo as Rin Utagawa
 Ayumi Ishida as Runa Jinnan
Kuishin Girls
 Maasa Sudo as Fuyumi Okubo
 Mizuki Fukumura as Haru Akasaka
 Erina Ikuta as Riko Nakano
 Kanon Suzuki as Mei Otsuka 
Judgement Squad
 You Kikkawa as Iroha Aoyama
 Saki Shimizu as Miku Azabu
 Chinami Tokunaga as Takako Jinguu
Nina Faction
 Sayuki Takagi as Haru Maihama
 Kurumi Yoshihashi as Natsu Hakkeijima
 Nanami Tanabe as Aki Daiba
Eite Butai
 Saki Nakajima as Satoko Komaba
 Chisato Okai as Tomoko Mita
 Mai Hagiwara as Yuko Yotsuya
Devil Sisters
 Kei Yasuda as Akina Sugamo
 Kaori Iida as Seiko Akasuka
Others
 Momoko Tsugunaga as Tomoko Harajuku
 Tetsuya Makita as Tsutomi Imawaka
 Erina Mano as Reiko Shirogane
 Karin Miyamoto as Yu Meguro
 Rika Ishikawa as Kina Machida

Episode Information

References

External links
  

Nippon TV dramas
2012 Japanese television series debuts
Japanese drama television series
Japanese high school television series
2012 Japanese television series endings
Hello! Project
Television series about teenagers